St. Cosmas' and St. Mary's Church is a church in Kolkondas, Fier County, Albania. It is a Cultural Monument of Albania, and is dedicated to the Virgin Mary and to Cosmas of Aetolia.

References

Cultural Monuments of Albania
Buildings and structures in Fier
Churches in Albania